This is the list of the presidents of the Regional Council of Lombardy during all its history.

Notes

Lombardy
Politics of Lombardy
Presidents
Lists of politicians